Muniria angustisepala is a flowering plant in the mint family Lamiaceae and is endemic to the Northern Territory. It is an erect shrub with softly hairy, warty leaves and pale yellow, woolly flowers.

Description

The flowers are solitary in groups of up to three in leaf axils on a short, sticky, hairy stalk. There are sticky, hairy bracts and bracteoles at the base of the flower. The sepals are linear to narrow lance-shaped, sticky and hairy and ribbed on the outside.
The four stamens extend beyond the end of the tube, the lower pair longer than the upper ones. Flowering occurs from January to September and is followed by fruit which is oblong but with four distinct ridges and has the sepals attached.

Taxonomy and naming
This species was first formally described in 1979 by Ahmad Abid Munir from a specimen collected near the UDP Falls (now Gunlom Falls). It was given the name Pityrodia angustisepala and the description was published in Journal of the Adelaide Botanic Gardens. In 2011, Barry Conn, Murray Henwood and Nicola Streiber described a new genus, Muniria and transferred this species to it. The specific epithet (angustisepala) is derived from the Latin word angustus meaning "narrow"  and the New Latin sepalum meaning "sepal".

Distribution
This species only occurs in northern parts of the Northern Territory, including in Kakadu , Limmen, and Nitmiluk National Parks in the Arnhem Plateau, Darwin Coastal, Gulf Coastal, Gulf Fall and Uplands and Pine Creek biogeographic regions.

Conservation
Muniria angustisepala is classified as "least concern" under the Territory Parks and Wildlife Conservation Act.

References

External links
Muniria angustisepala occurrence data from Australasian Virtual Herbarium
 
 

angustisepala
Plants described in 1979
Flora of the Northern Territory